Introduction to Algorithms is a book on computer programming by Thomas H. Cormen, Charles E. Leiserson, Ronald L. Rivest, and Clifford Stein. The book has been widely used as the textbook for algorithms courses at many universities and is commonly cited as a reference for algorithms in published papers, with over 10,000 citations documented on CiteSeerX.  The book sold half a million copies during its first 20 years. Its fame has led to the common use of the abbreviation "CLRS" (Cormen, Leiserson, Rivest, Stein), or, in the first edition, "CLR" (Cormen, Leiserson, Rivest).

In the preface, the authors write about how the book was written to be comprehensive and useful in both teaching and professional environments. Each chapter focuses on an algorithm, and discusses its design techniques and areas of application. Instead of using a specific programming language, the algorithms are written in pseudocode. The descriptions focus on the aspects of the algorithm itself, its mathematical properties, and emphasize efficiency.

Editions
The first edition of the textbook did not include Stein as an author, and thus the book became known by the initialism CLR. It included two chapters ("Arithmetic Circuits" & "Algorithms for Parallel Computers") that were dropped in the second edition. After the addition of the fourth author in the second edition, many began to refer to the book as "CLRS".  This first edition of the book was also known as "The Big White Book (of Algorithms)."  With the second edition, the predominant color of the cover changed to green, causing the nickname to be shortened to just "The Big Book (of Algorithms)." The third edition was published in August 2009. The fourth edition was published in April 2022, which has colors added to improve visual presentations.

Cover design
The mobile depicted on the cover, Big Red (1959) by Alexander Calder, can be found at the Whitney Museum of American Art in New York City. An Introduction to Language by Fromkin also uses Calder's mobile on its cover.

Table of contents
Source

Publication history
 
  12 printings up to 2009, errata:
  1320 pp., 5 printings up to 2016, errata:
  1312 pp., errata:

See also
 The Art of Computer Programming

References

External links
  on MIT Press

1990 non-fiction books
Computer science books
MIT Press books